William Duke may refer to:

 William Duke (civil servant) (1863–1924), governor of Bengal
 William Duke (artist) (1814–1853), Irish-born Australian artist
 William Duke (mathematician) (born 1958), American mathematician
 William B. Duke (1857–1926), American Hall of Fame racehorse trainer
 William Mark Duke (1879–1971), Canadian archbishop